Nebraska Highway 52 is a highway in central Nebraska. The south terminus is at an intersection with Nebraska Highway 14 north of Fullerton. The northern terminus is located north of Primrose at an intersection with Nebraska Highway 91.

Route description
Nebraska Highway 52 begins north of Fullerton at Nebraska Highway 14.  It goes west through farmland and turns north to pass through Belgrade.  Shortly after Belgrade, the highway turns northwest and turns west when it meets Nebraska Highway 56.  They overlap into Cedar Rapids, where Highway 52 turns north again.  It goes north, then west, then turns northwest to go through Primrose.  After passing through Primrose, the highway turns north and ends when it meets Nebraska Highway 91.

Major intersections

References

External links

Nebraska Roads: NE 41-60

052
Transportation in Nance County, Nebraska
Transportation in Boone County, Nebraska